This is a list of municipalities in Mato Grosso ordered by Human Development Index (HDI) according to data released by the United Nations Development Program (UNDP) of the United Nations for 2010 (although old, they are the most current data available). The Human Development Index was developed in 1990 by the Pakistani economist Mahbub ul Haq and the Indian economist Amartya Sen.

According to the list. of the 141 municipalities in the state of Mato Grosso, none of them have very high HDI (equal to or greater than 0.800), 49 have high HDI (between 0.700 and 0.799), 89 have medium (between 0.600 and 0.699), 3 have low (between 0.500 and 0.599), and none of them have a very low (less than 0.500). The HDI of the state of Mato Grosso is 0.774 (considered high).

Criteria

Categories 
The index varies from 0 to 1, considering:

 Very high – 0.800 to 1.000
 High – 0.700 to 0.799
 Medium – 0.600 to 0.699
 Low – 0.500 to 0.599
 Very low – 0.000 to 0.499

Components 
The HDI of the municipalities is an average between the income index, life expectancy index and educational index.

List

References

See also 
 Geography of Brazil
 List of cities in Brazil

Mato Grosso
Mato Grosso